Zbyněk Michálek (born 23 December 1982) is a Czech former professional ice hockey defenceman. He most recently played for Sparta Praha of the Czech Extraliga (ELH). Michálek has also previously played in the NHL for the Minnesota Wild, Arizona Coyotes, Pittsburgh Penguins, and St. Louis Blues. He is the older brother of former NHL star and current UFA Milan Michálek.

Playing career

Junior

Michálek played two seasons of major junior ice hockey for the Shawinigan Cataractes of the Quebec Major Junior Hockey League (QMJHL). He was not drafted in any NHL Entry Draft, but began playing professional hockey in 2002 with the Houston Aeros of the American Hockey League (AHL), winning a Calder Cup championship with the team in 2003.

Professional

Minnesota Wild, Phoenix Coyotes
Michálek made his NHL debut during the 2003–04 season with the Minnesota Wild, the Aeros' NHL affiliate. In 2005, Michálek was traded to the Phoenix Coyotes in exchange for Erik Westrum and Dustin Wood. He played five seasons for the Coyotes, leading the NHL in blocked shots during the 2008–09 season. His excellent play continued into 2010, as he helped the Coyotes earn a Stanley Cup playoff berth for the first time since 2002.

Pittsburgh Penguins
On 1 July 2010, the first day of the NHL free agency period, Michálek signed a five-year, $20 million contract with the Pittsburgh Penguins as an unrestricted free agent. Prior to his signing, Michálek was described as "The Defenseman Every Team Wants" by AOL Fanhouse due to his strong defensive skills, durability and shot-blocking. In 2010–11, Michálek scored his first goal for the Penguins in a 3–1 win over the Buffalo Sabres on 8 March 2011.

Return to Phoenix, St. Louis Blues, second return to Arizona
On 22 June 2012, during the 2012 NHL Entry Draft, Michálek was traded back to the Coyotes in exchange for Harrison Ruopp, goaltender Marc Cheverie and a 2012 third-round draft pick (81st overall). Michálek played two further seasons in the Coyotes organization, whereupon in 2014–15, as a pending unrestricted free agent, he was traded at the NHL trade deadline on 2 March 2015, to the St. Louis Blues, along with a conditional third-round pick in 2015, in exchange for prospect Maxim Letunov, despite Michálek recovering from a concussion at the time. On 1 July 2015 Michálek was re-signed by the Coyotes as a free agent.

After the 2016 preseason, Michálek was cut from the Arizona Coyotes, and thus placed on waivers by the Arizona Coyotes. On Sunday 19 March 2017, he was called up by the Coyotes from the Tucson Roadrunners to play the following day. He ended up playing two games after that one, accumulating a total of no points, no minutes spent in the sinbin, and a plus-one rating in three total games.

On 19 October 2017, Michálek signed with Sparta Praha of the Czech Extraliga (ELH).

International play

 
Michálek played for the Czech Republic, alongside his brother Milan Michálek, at the 2010 Winter Olympics. He was also selected to represent the Czech Republic at the 2011 IIHF World Championship, where he won bronze alongside his brother.

Personal life
Michálek is married to Helena (born in 1979 in Bosnia and Herzegovina) and they have three children together, a son and two daughters. Michálek's younger brother Milan formerly played in the NHL.

Career statistics

Regular season and playoffs

International

See also
 Notable families in the NHL

References

External links

1982 births
Arizona Coyotes players
Czech ice hockey defencemen
Houston Aeros (1994–2013) players
Ice hockey players at the 2010 Winter Olympics
Ice hockey players at the 2014 Winter Olympics
Living people
Minnesota Wild players
Olympic ice hockey players of the Czech Republic
People from Jindřichův Hradec
Phoenix Coyotes players
Pittsburgh Penguins players
Shawinigan Cataractes players
HC Sparta Praha players
Tucson Roadrunners players
Undrafted National Hockey League players
Sportspeople from the South Bohemian Region
Czech expatriate ice hockey players in the United States
Czech expatriate ice hockey players in Canada